Lucy Margaret Mary Birley (née Helmore; 18 September 1959 – 23 July 2018) was a British model, photographer, and socialite.

Biography
Birley was born in Shropshire and raised in Kensington She was the daughter of Mary (née Hull) and Patrick Helmore, an underwriter at the Lloyd's of London insurance corporation. Her brother is Edward Helmore, a journalist for The Guardian and The Observer. 

She attended Woldingham School and began fox-hunting at the age of twelve.

She left home at seventeen and moved in with several friends, including actor Rupert Everett.

Career 
Birley (then Helmore) began her career as a fashion model in her late teens. She worked with many noted photographers, including Steven Meisel and Robert Mapplethorpe. Her distinctive sense of style influenced designers such as Christian Lacroix, Manolo Blahnik and Philip Treacy.

In May 1982, she was photographed wearing a medieval helmet and holding a falcon at Crumlin Lodge, outside of Inverin, Connemara for the cover of Roxy Music's album Avalon.

As a photographer she worked solely with manual cameras and favoured a twin-lens Rolleiflex camera. Birley developed her own film and exhibited her work in London. Some of her subjects were Damien Hirst and Isabella Blow.

Private life 
She began dating Bryan Ferry after his girlfriend Jerry Hall left him for Mick Jagger. Ferry was fourteen years her senior.

On 26 June 1982, at the age of twenty two she married Bryan Ferry at the Church of St Anthony and St George at Duncton, West Sussex. They had four sons: Otis, Isaac, Tara, and Merlin. They divorced on 31 March 2003.

She battled alcoholism, substance dependency and depression. In the 1990s, Birley attended Narcotics Anonymous and Alcoholics Anonymous to help recover from addiction.

In October 2006, she married Robin Birley, son of Mark Birley and Lady Annabel Goldsmith.

Death 
She died of a self-inflicted gunshot wound on 23 July 2018, aged 58, while on holiday in County Clare, Ireland following what was described by her brother Ed Helmore as "a long battle with depression". Her husband announced her death in a joint statement with her children: "On Monday Lucy Birley (nee Helmore) passed away whilst on holiday in Ireland, surrounded by her beloved dogs, Daisy, Peg and Daphne. Her husband Robin, and her sons – Otis, Isaac, Tara and Merlin – are understandably devastated and request that their privacy be respected during this difficult time".

Birley's ashes were scattered at her mother's grave in County Clare.

References

1959 births
2018 deaths
2018 suicides
Suicides by firearm in Ireland
Photographers from Shropshire
English female models
Lucy
People from Oswestry